Danielle Heijkoop (born 16 April 1987) is a Dutch dressage rider.

She won silver medal at the 2013 European Dressage Championship in the team competition. She has qualified for the 2014 Dressage World Cup Final in Lyon after finishing 9th overall in the 2013/14 Western European League rankings.

References

1987 births
Living people
Dutch dressage riders
Dutch female equestrians
Sportspeople from Rotterdam
21st-century Dutch women